Malkapur is the municipal council in Satara district, Maharashtra.

History
Malkapur is a Municipal Council city in Satara district, Maharashtra. The Malkapur city is divided into 20 wards for which elections are held every 5 years. The Jamner Municipal Council has population of 46,762 of which 24,270 are males while 22,492 are females as per report released by Census India 2011.

Municipal Council election

Electoral performance 2019

References 

Municipal councils in Maharashtra